The 1973–74 season is the 64th season of competitive football in Germany.

Promotion and relegation

Pre Season

Post Season

National teams

Germany national football team

1974 FIFA World Cup

Friendly matches

League season

Bundesliga

DFB–Pokal

German clubs in Europe

European Cup

Bayern Munich

Bayern Munich won the 1973–74 European Cup defeating Atlético Madrid 4–0 in a replay of the 1974 European Cup Final.  The replay was needed because the first match between the two clubs ended as a 1–1 draw.

European Cup Winners' Cup

Borussia Mönchengladbach

Borussia Mönchengladbach were eliminated in the semi-finals of the European Cup Winners' Cup by A.C. Milan.

UEFA Cup

Fortuna Düsseldorf

Fortuna Düsseldorf were eliminated in the third round of the UEFA Cup by Lokomotive Leipzig.

1. FC Köln

1. FC Köln were eliminated in the quarter-finals of the UEFA Cup by Tottenham Hotspur F.C.

VfB Stuttgart

VfB Stuttgart were eliminated in the semi-finals of the UEFA Cup by eventual champions Feyenoord.

Wuppertaler SV

Wuppertaler SV were eliminated in the first round of the UEFA Cup by Ruch Chorzów.

Sources

 
Seasons in German football